As I Lay Dying/American Tragedy is a split album by the two metalcore bands As I Lay Dying and American Tragedy released in 2002 through Pluto Records. As I Lay Dying has since re-released its half of the album through Metal Blade Records.  Their compilation album A Long March: The First Recordings also features the original and re-recorded tracks from the split album. Tracks 1 through 5 are performed by As I Lay Dying, while tracks 6 through 11 are performed by the now defunct American Tragedy.

American Tragedy's sound on the split album is slightly similar to that of As I Lay Dying.

Track listing

Credits
As I Lay Dying
Tim Lambesis – lead vocals
Evan White – lead guitar
Brandon Hays – bass
Jordan Mancino – drums
Tommy Garcia – rhythm guitar, backing vocals

American Tragedy
Tim Syler – vocals
Jon Greene – lead guitar
Todd Shields – bass
Ryan Douglass – rhythm guitar
Justin Greene – drums

Other credits
Nolan Brett – mastering
Jeff Forest – recording, engineering, harmony vocals 
Eric Shirey – executive producer 
Brian Cobbel – executive producer

References

2002 albums
American Tragedy (band) albums
As I Lay Dying (band) albums
Split albums